Parmeliella triptophylloides is a species of corticolous (bark-dwelling) lichen in the family Pannariaceae. Found in east Africa, it was formally described as a new species in 2003 by Norwegian lichenologist Per Magnus Jørgensen. In addition to the type locality, it has also been recorded from the Luhangalo Plateau in Tanzania.

Parmeliella triptophylloides has a thallus that is both crustose (crusty) and squamulose (scaley), and in maturity breaks into areoles. The thallus rests upon a blackish, crust-like prothallus. Greyish-blue isidia covers the squamules and obscure the thallus. The lichen is somewhat similar in morphology to Parmeliella triptophylla; the specific epithet triptophylloides refers to this resemblance.

References

Peltigerales
Lichen species
Lichens described in 2003
Lichens of Africa
Taxa named by Per Magnus Jørgensen